Pearce Bailey (1865–1922) was an American neurologist and psychiatrist, educated at Princeton and Columbia Universities. He became a consultant in several New York hospitals and with Collins and Frankel founded the Neurological Institute. He was also appointed an associate professor of neurology in Columbia. On the entry of the United States into World War I, he was appointed chief of the division of neurology and psychiatry in the United States army with the rank of colonel. He perfected a system for weeding out "mental defectives" which is said to have been used as a model by the Allies. His major literary efforts comprised a translation of Golobievski's Atlas and Epitome of Diseases Caused by Accident (1900) and a monograph Accident and Injury; Relation to the Nervous System (1906), which was later expanded into Diseases of the Nervous System Resulting from Accident and Injury, a valuable work for the medical world. At the time of his death, Bailey was chairman of the New York State Committee for Mental Defectives.

References

Columbia University Vagelos College of Physicians and Surgeons alumni
United States Army personnel of World War I
American neurologists
1865 births
1922 deaths
Princeton University alumni
American psychiatrists